(French for "stubborn") is the main LGBTQIA magazine published in France. It was subtitled in French  until 2007, and reaffirmed itself as a men's magazine since then. As of December, 2012, its certified circulation was of 41,961 copies monthly. Publication stopped in 2015 until the magazine was reborn and issued its next issue on 28 February 2017.

History
Published since 1995, co-founded by Didier Lestrade and Pascal Loubet, and historically directed by Pierre Bergé, Têtu was started following the demise of Gai Pied magazine (published between 1979 and 1992). Pierre Bergé sold the magazine in January 2013 and since then it has been owned by Jean-Jacques Augier.

Têtu declared bankruptcy in January 2015 and went into liquidation in July 2015 having made €1.1million ($1.2million) in losses in 2014.

In November 2015 a French start-up, Idyls, bought Têtu and it started publishing again online only.

Overview
The magazine contains interviews on LGBT issues, with politicians, celebrities, writers, dancers and so forth, along with articles and reviews on LGBT-themed books, films, plays or video games. Another section is concerned with LGBT news around the world, country by country. There are also posters, advertisements of brand clothes for men. Additionally, some pages are dedicated to news about AIDS, prevention and treatment. Periodically a free information guide entitled Têtu+ is published about HIV and AIDS.

The magazine has also touched upon international cases when coming to LGBTQs public figures of non-French cultures. In October 2012, Tetu have sent reporters to Jordan to do a story on Jordanian LGBT magazine's spokesperson, model Khalid, aka Kali of  My.Kali magazine.

Controversy
This caused controversy in New Zealand, with some Māori people saying that Palisson was being disrespectful to their culture and that permission should have been sought from a particular  as the  usually represents  affiliation. Palisson was eventually forced to apologise for any offence caused and stressed that he respects tattoo traditions.

References

External links
 Official site 

1995 establishments in France
2015 disestablishments in France
Cultural magazines
French-language magazines
LGBT-related magazines published in France
Lifestyle magazines
Magazines established in 1995
Magazines disestablished in 2015
Magazines established in 2017
Magazines published in Paris
LGBT culture in Paris